Alexander "Oghogho" Oduokpe (born 25 December 1992) is a Nigerian international footballer who plays as a forward for Maccabi Herzliya. Oghogho Oduokpe was discovered by a youth team Karamone then moved to Tolopia United F.C. where he was able to play against Warri Wolves. He made his debut game and debut goal in the Israel league for Maccabi Herzliya  gaining a point away,  he also scored a goal and assisted a goal on away victory on 11 March 2016.

Club career
He started his playing career with Karamone youth team later joined Tolopia United FC from there got the eye of Warri Wolves of Jos where he started exploding his talents winning a lot of honours and awards such the best striker of the team, team highest goal scorer ever for the team in a season and also was the youngest best striker of Warri Wolves ever signed. He made his way to limelight which made interest from teams locally and internationally but Warri Wolves were unable to convince the powerful and ball shield attacker to stay. He was lured in by Enugu Rangers International Football Club. He was signed by Enugu Rangers to play in the Caf Champions league, Nigeria Premier League and Nigeria Federation FA cup 2012 and 2013 season. He got interest from Different foreign teams in Europe, Asia and African teams that Enugu Rangers played against in the Caf Champions League like Cape Town, He won many honors and awards as MVP player of the game, Best Striker in his team, best goal poacher and wonder goal award. Oghogho Oduokpe's representative is Ramone Remmie.

CAF Champions and Nigeria Premier League Goals Links
Oghogho Oduokpe Goal for Rangers FC - Nigeria Premier league
Oghogho Oduokpe brace- Nigeria Premier League
Oghogho Oduokpe Brace saves Bayelsa Utd from relegation - Nigeria Premier LEague
Oghogho Oduokpe goal- Nigeria Premier League
Oghogho Oduokpe goal sealed 3 points- Nigeria Premier league
 Oghogho Oduopke

International career
He had featured for Enugu Rangers International FC in the 2012/13 Caf Champions League. He scored and assisted goals.

References

 Oghogo Oduopke Profile- African Football
 Best Player of the week - Nigeria Premier League

Youtube Video-links
 Actions of Oghogho Oduope - youtube
 The Documentary of Oghogho Oduokpe - Youtube video
 One of the best goal of Oghogho Oduokpe - Youtube Video Action
 Oghogho Oduokpe scored 2nd goal - Sunshine stars vs Bayelsa utd

External links
 http://www.goal.com/en-ng/news/4111/nigeria-premier-league/2014/01/19/4555366/sunshine-stars-are-gold-cup-champions
 http://www.goal.com/en-ng/news/4093/nigeria/2012/06/29/3209763/sunshine-stars-akwa-united-abs-crash-out-of-federation-cup
 http://www.completesportsnigeria.com/enyimba-pillars-dolphins-crash/

1992 births
Living people
Nigerian footballers
Nigeria international footballers
Warri Wolves F.C. players
Rangers International F.C. players
Sunshine Stars F.C. players
Maccabi Herzliya F.C. players
Nigeria Professional Football League players
Liga Leumit players
Karamone F.C. players
Nigerian expatriate footballers
Expatriate footballers in Israel
Nigerian expatriate sportspeople in Israel
Association football forwards